Raven Avery Greene (born February 2, 1995) is an American football safety who is a free agent. He played college football at James Madison and signed with the Green Bay Packers as an undrafted free agent in 2018.

Early years
Greene attended and played high school football at First Colonial High School.

College career
Greene played college football at James Madison University. He played in 58 games, recording 154 tackles with 34 passes broken up and 14 interceptions.

Professional career

Green Bay Packers
On May 4, 2018, the Green Bay Packers signed Greene to a three-year, $1.71 million contract that includes a signing bonus of $3,500.

Throughout training camp, Greene competed against Jermaine Whitehead to be the primary backup free safety behind starter Ha Ha Clinton-Dix. Head coach Mike McCarthy named Greene the third free safety on the Packers’ depth chart to begin the regular season, behind Clinton-Dix and Whitehead.

Greene was inactive as a healthy scratch for the first two regular season games. On September 23, 2018, he made his professional regular season debut in a Week 3 loss to the Washington Redskins. On October 30, 2018, the Packers traded Clinton-Dix to the Redskins. As a result, Greene became the primary backup free safety behind Whitehead. The Packers placed Greene on injured reserve on December 8, 2018 with an ankle injury.

On September 16, 2019, Greene was placed on injured reserve with an ankle injury. He was designated for return from injured reserve on January 2, 2020, and began practicing with the team again. He was activated on January 18, 2020 prior to the NFC Championship game.

In Week 9 of the 2020 season against the San Francisco 49ers on Thursday Night Football, Greene recorded his first career interception off a pass thrown by Nick Mullens during the 34–17 win. He was placed on injured reserve on December 9, 2020.

Tampa Bay Buccaneers
On May 5, 2021, Greene signed with the Tampa Bay Buccaneers. He was waived/injured on August 18, 2021 and placed on injured reserve. He was released on August 27.

NFL career statistics

References

External links

Green Bay Packers bio
James Madison Dukes bio

1995 births
Living people
Sportspeople from Virginia Beach, Virginia
Players of American football from Virginia
American football safeties
James Madison Dukes football players
Green Bay Packers players
Tampa Bay Buccaneers players